Vic Wallace (born c. 1942) is a former American football and wrestling coach. He served as the head football coach at William Jewell College in Liberty, Missouri from 1981 to 1986, St. Thomas University in St. Paul, Minnesota from 1987 to 1992, Lambuth University in Jackson, Tennessee from 1993 to 2007, and Rockford University in Rockford, Illinois from 2011 to 2014, compiling a career college football coaching record of 180–145–1. Wallace was also the head wrestling coach at Carroll College—now known as Carroll University—in Waukesha, Wisconsin from 1974 to 1977 and Morningside College in Sioux City, Iowa from 1977 to 1978. He spent the 1980 football season as the offensive coordinator as Texas Tech University.

Head coaching record

Football

References

Year of birth missing (living people)
1940s births
Living people
Carroll Pioneers football coaches
Lambuth Eagles football coaches
Morningside Mustangs football coaches
Rockford Regents football coaches
St. Thomas (Minnesota) Tommies football coaches
Texas Tech Red Raiders football coaches
William Jewell Cardinals football coaches
College wrestling coaches in the United States
Cornell College alumni
University of Northern Iowa alumni